The 2022 Collingwood Football Club season is the club's 126th season of senior competition in the Australian Football League (AFL). The club also fielded its reserves team in the Victorian Football League and women's teams in the AFL Women's and VFL Women's competitions.

Overview

AFL squad
 Players are listed by guernsey number, and 2022 statistics are for AFL regular season and finals series matches during the 2022 AFL season only. Career statistics include a player's complete AFL career, which, as a result, means that a player's debut and part or whole of their career statistics may be for another club. Statistics are correct as of the 2nd Preliminary final of the 2022 season (17 September 2022) and are taken from AFL Tables.

Additionally to the regular squad, due to COVID-19, the club was allowed to have 20 top-up players on standby who can be used if there are only 25 players left available from the regular squad. Collingwood listed players from their VFL squad, including former Melbourne player Neville Jetta who joined the club as a developmental coach.

Squad changes

In

Out

AFL season

Pre-season matches

Regular season

Finals series

Ladder

Awards & Milestones

AFL Awards
 Anzac Medal – Jack Ginnivan (Round 6)
 2022 22under22 selection – Isaac Quaynor
 2022 22under22 selection – Jack Ginnivan
 2022 22under22 selection – Nick Daicos
 2022 AFL Rising Star – Nick Daicos
 AFL Players Association Best Captain – Scott Pendlebury
 AFL Players Association Best First-year Player – Nick Daicos
 2022 All-Australian team – Brayden Maynard
 AFL Coaches Association Senior Coach of the Year – Craig McRae

AFL Award Nominations
 Round 3 – 2022 AFL Rising Star nomination – Nick Daicos
 Round 6 – 2022 AFL Rising Star nomination – Jack Ginnivan
 2022 All-Australian team 44-man squad – Jack Crisp, Josh Daicos, Brayden Maynard

Club Awards
  – Jack Crisp
  – Scott Pendlebury
  – Darcy Moore
  – Jeremy Howe
  – Steele Sidebottom
  – Finlay Macrae
  – Brayden Maynard
  – Nick Daicos
  – Brody Mihocek
  – Beau McCreery

Milestones
 Round 1 – Nick Daicos (AFL debut)
 Round 1 – Patrick Lipinski (Collingwood debut)
 Round 1 – Jamie Elliott (200 goals)
 Round 2 – Nathan Kreuger (Collingwood debut)
 Round 3 – Reef McInnes (AFL debut)
 Round 5 – Jeremy Howe (200 AFL games, 100 Collingwood games)
 Round 6 – John Noble (50 games)
 Round 7 – Aiden Begg (AFL debut)
 Round 15 – Isaac Chugg (AFL debut)
 Round 15 – Brayden Maynard (150 games)
 Round 16 – Isaac Quaynor (50 games)
 Round 17 – Josh Carmichael (AFL debut)
 Round 18 – Scott Pendlebury (350 games)
 Round 18 – Ash Johnson (AFL debut)
 Round 19 – Taylor Adams (150 Collingwood games)
 Round 21 – Jamie Elliott (150 games)
 Round 23 – Darcy Cameron (50 AFL games)
 Qualifying final – Darcy Cameron (50 Collingwood games)
 Qualifying final – Brody Mihocek (100 games)
 Semi-final – Mason Cox (100 goals)
 Preliminary final – Jack Crisp (200 games)

VFL season

Pre-season and practice matches

Regular season

Finals series

Ladder

AFLW seasons

2022 AFL Women's season (January to April)

Pre-season matches

Regular season

Finals series

Ladder

Squad
 Players are listed by guernsey number, and 2022 statistics are for AFL Women's regular season and finals series matches during the 2022 AFL Women's season only. Career statistics include a player's complete AFL Women's career, which, as a result, means that a player's debut and part or whole of their career statistics may be for another club. Statistics are correct as of the Qualifying Round of the 2022 season (27 March 2022) and are taken from Australian Football.

Squad changes
In

Out

League awards
 2022 22under22 selection – Jordyn Allen, Lauren Butler
 2022 AFL Women's All-Australian team – Jaimee Lambert, Ruby Schleicher

Club Awards
 Best and fairest – Jaimee Lambert
 Best first year player – Eliza James
 Players' player award – Lauren Butler
 Leading goalkicker – Chloe Molloy (8 goals)

Season Seven (August to November)

Pre-season matches

Regular season

Finals series

Ladder

Squad
 Players are listed by guernsey number, and S7 (2022) statistics are for AFL Women's regular season and finals series matches during the AFL Women's season seven only. Career statistics include a player's complete AFL Women's career, which, as a result, means that a player's debut and part or whole of their career statistics may be for another club. Statistics are correct as of the Semi-final of the AFL Women's season seven (12 November 2022) and are taken from Australian Football.

Squad changes
In

Out

League awards
 S7 (2022) 22under22 selection – Jordyn Allen

Club Awards
 Best and fairest – Jordyn Allen
 Best first year player – Emily Smith
 Players' player award – Lauren Butler
 Leading goalkicker – Eliza James (10 goals)

VFLW season

Pre-season matches

Regular season

Finals series

Ladder

Notes
 Key
 H ^ Home match.
 A ^ Away match.

 Notes
Collingwood's scores are indicated in bold font.
Match was played over 6 quarters with an extended squad, including VFL players.

References

External links
 Official website of the Collingwood Football Club
 Official website of the Australian Football League

2022
Collingwood
Collingwood
Collingwood